Tracy Byrd is the self-titled debut album of American country music artist Tracy Byrd. In order of release, the singles from this album were "That's the Thing About a Memory", "Someone to Give My Love To" (a cover of Johnny Paycheck's song), "Holdin' Heaven", and "Why Don't That Telephone Ring". "Holdin' Heaven" reached Number One on the Hot Country Songs charts in 1993.

"An Out of Control Raging Fire" would later be recorded by Patty Loveless (as a duet with Travis Tritt) on Loveless's Mountain Soul album. "Talk to Me Texas" was previously recorded by Keith Whitley for his 1989 posthumous album I Wonder Do You Think of Me.

Track listing

Personnel

Tracks 1, 2, 5, 7–10
Eddie Bayers – drums 
Bruce Bouton – pedal steel guitar
Tracy Byrd – lead vocals
Stuart Duncan – fiddle
Roy Huskey, Jr. – acoustic bass
Brent Mason – electric guitar
Tim Mensy – acoustic guitar
Weldon Myrick – pedal steel guitar
Hargus "Pig" Robbins – piano
Jerry Salley – background vocals
Dennis Wilson – background vocals
Glenn Worf – bass guitar
Curtis Young – background vocals
Andrea Zonn – background vocals

Tracks 3, 4, 6
Bruce Bouton – pedal steel guitar
Larry Byrom – electric guitar
Glen Duncan – fiddle
Pat Flynn – acoustic guitar
Owen Hale – drums
David Hungate – bass guitar
Randy McCormick – keyboards, piano
Dawn Sears – duet vocals on track 6

Chart performance

References

1993 debut albums
Tracy Byrd albums
MCA Records albums
Albums produced by Keith Stegall
albums produced by Tony Brown (record producer)